Amanakkunattnam is a village located in Aruppukottai Taluk, Virudhunagar district, Tamil Nadu, India.

References

Villages in Virudhunagar district